The Albert H. Maggs Composition Award is a commission-based Australian classical composition award given in order to "encourage and assist composers who might otherwise abandon their efforts for want of means".
 
The award was founded in 1966 by Albert H. Maggs, a Melbourne-based professional bookmaker, amateur pianist and patron of the arts and medicine.  He initially provided $10,000, and made later contributions to keep the award viable.

The only qualification is that applicants must have resided in Australia for at least two years before the closing date for applications, in March.  It is administered by the University of Melbourne and is awarded annually in August.

The winner agrees to submit their work within 18 months of the award being made.  The current value of the award is $7,000 with another $3,000 as a performance subsidy.

List of winners
The following composers have been awarded the Albert H. Maggs Composition Award:

 1967	Nigel Butterley
 1968	Larry Sitsky
 1969	Colin Brumby
 1970	Keith Humble
 1971	Raymond Hanson
 1972	George Dreyfus
 1973	Graham Hair
 1974	Donald Hollier
 1975	Ann Carr-Boyd
 1975	George Tibbits
 1976	Eric Gross
 1977	Tristram Cary
 1978	Barry Conyngham
 1979	Richard Hames
 1979	Vincent Plush
 1980	David Worrall
 1981	Larry Sitsky
 1982	Richard Mills
 1983	Božidar Kos
 1984	Brenton Broadstock
 1985	Andrew Schultz
 1986	Warren Burt
 1987	Chu Wang-Hua
 1988	Julian Yu
 1989	no award given
 1990	Mary Finsterer
 1991	Stephen Cronin
 1992	Mark Pollard
 1993	Lesleigh Thompson
 1994	Gerard Brophy
 1995	Thomas Reiner
 1996	Wilfred Lehmann
 1997	David Joseph
 1998	Christopher Willcock
 1999	Wilfred Lehmann
 2000	Gerard Brophy
 2001	Stuart Greenbaum
 2002	Lawrence Whiffin
 2005	John Peterson
 2006	Johanna Selleck
 2007	Mark Isaacs
 2008  Barry Conyngham
 2009  Kate Neal
 2010  Paul Stanhope
 2011  Katy Abbott
 2012  Andrew Ford
 2013  Brenton Broadstock
 2014  Tim Dargaville
 2015  Julian Yu
 2016  Peter Knight
 2017 Lachlan Skipworth
 2018 Natalie Williams
 2019 Wally Gunn
 2020 Nigel Westlake
 2021 Anne Cawrse

Sources

 
 Australian Music Centre
 University of Melbourne Statute: R7.127 The Albert H. Maggs Composition Award

Australian music awards
Classical music awards
1967 establishments in Australia